Ptinus fur, the whitemarked spider beetle, is a species of spider beetle in the genus Ptinus (family Ptinidae), with a nearly cosmopolitan distribution.

Description
Adults are morphologically similar to other spider beetle species, notably the hairy spider beetle (Ptinus villiger). It is red-brown in colour with yellow hairs, and measures  in length. The prothorax is densely covered with pale hairs, while the elytra bear some patches of white scales.

Distribution and Habitat
It is a pest of stored foods, with a worldwide distribution, where it may be identified through leaving webbed, granular materials on the stored products. Ptinus fur adults feed on dried and decaying animal and vegetable material. It has also been identified as a pest in museums, damaging stored collections.

It has been found in the nests of birds, notably the Sand Martin.

Life cycle
The optimum temperature for rapid development of Ptinus fur is about 23 °C, at which temperature it completes its development in a mean period of 132 days. Larvae of P. fur normally moult three times at 23°Cm but some have an extra moult.

Well defined diapause as mature larvae in cocoons occurs at low temperatures in some individuals of Ptinus fur: at 23 °C this lasts about 220 days after normal larvae have pupated; at 20 °C the period lasts about 280 days.

The adult beetles live for several months.

References

External links
Images of Ptinus fur female
Images of Ptinus fur

fur
Beetles described in 1758
Taxa named by Carl Linnaeus
Agricultural pest insects
Beetles of Europe